East Dean and Friston is a civil parish in the Wealden District of East Sussex, England.The two villages in the parish are in a dry valley on the South Downs – between Eastbourne three miles (4.8 km) to the east and Seaford an equal distance to the west. The main A259 road goes through both village centres. The coast and much of the land between it and the A259 from the east edge of Seaford to the west edge of Eastbourne is owned by the National Trust, and this has prevented further development to the area. The civil parish was formed on 1 April 1999 from "East Dean" and "Friston" parishes.

Governance
Eastdean and Friston is part of the electoral ward called East Dean. This ward had a population at the 2011 Census of 2,258.

The villages 
East Dean lies in the valley bottom: Friston is at the top of the hill to the west. Within both villages are a large number of buildings of historic interest.

The church in East Dean, dedicated to St Simon and St Jude, has a Saxon tower and an unusual Tapsel gate (preventing cattle from entering the churchyard); that at Friston is dedicated to St Mary the Virgin. The churches have formed a united benefice since 1688. The latter contains Tudor monuments to the local family Selwyn and the grave of the composer Frank Bridge (1879–1941).

John Eric Bartholomew OBE, stage name Eric Morecambe, of Morecambe & Wise fame, can trace his descent from John Bartholomew (c.1791–1854), a resident of Crowlink, Parish of Friston in the Census of 1841 and was living in the Parish of East Dean in the 1851 Census. John's son, Henry Bartholomew (1829–1908) moved to Overton, Lancashire, near Morecambe in the late 1840s and later into Morecambe itself. Henry's third child John Bartholomew 1860–1934 was the father of George Bartholomew 1898–1976, Eric's father.

Birling Gap

Birling Gap is a coastal hamlet within the parish. It is situated on the Seven Sisters not far from Beachy Head and is owned by the National Trust. Coastal erosion has already removed some of the row of coastguard cottages built in 1878, but those that remain are still inhabited. 

There are a cafe, shop and visitor centre run by National Trust, and a metal staircase leading down to the enclosed pebble beach and the Seven Sisters chalk cliffs. In time, the houses are likely to be demolished due to the severe coastal erosion; the Government has concluded that the commercial value of the houses does not justify the construction of sea defences. If walkers are cut off at high tide, they can climb the ladder, which is replaced often, to Birling Gap.

The beach, which was awarded the Blue flag rural beach award in 2005, is advertised by Naturist UK. It has a large number of rockpools.

Noted artist Jean Cooke lived in two cottages at Birling Gap. She painted seascapes there and died in 2008 while looking at the sea.

In August 2017 hundreds of people suffered ill-effects after a suspected chemical poisoning incident.

Geography
The main rock type at Birling Gap is chalk. Other rock types outcropping here include flint, loess and soil. The coastline is part of the Site of Special Scientific Interest Seaford to Beachy Head, which falls within the parish. The site is of biological and geological interest.

There is also extensive evidence and visible earthworks here for an Iron Age hillfort on the site – although nearly half of it has already been lost to the sea. Information boards at the site show how it would have originally looked; however, even more will be lost due to the geological nature of these chalk cliffs.

See also
List of civil parishes in England

References

External links 

A photo comparison of contemporary and historic East Dean

Civil parishes in East Sussex
Wealden District
National Trust properties in East Sussex
Populated coastal places in East Sussex